Peroxisomal N(1)-acetyl-spermine/spermidine oxidase is an enzyme that in humans is encoded by the PAOX gene.

References

Further reading